7Bravo is an Australian free-to-air digital television multichannel, which was launched by the Seven Network on 15 January 2023.
 The channel contains programming from NBCUniversal's American networks, including Bravo, E! and Oxygen along with entertainment and talk show programming from NBC and its American broadcast syndication division.

History 
On 25 October 2022, it was announced that Seven would be launching a new channel, 7Bravo, on 15 January 2023, featuring content from NBCUniversal, timing with the announcement of the wind-down of Foxtel's domestic version of E! on 31 January 2023 at the end of their NBCU output deal. On 30 November 2022, a blank channel appeared on the Seven multiplex. It remained a dark screen until 14 December, when it carried a still with the channel's logo for a month. A lead-up video loop aired on 14 January, promoting the channel's launch the next day, which began with a marathon of the latest season of Million Dollar Listing New York.

Programming
Programs aired on 7Bravo are mix of programs from NBCUniversal's channels including E!, Oxygen, NBC, and Bravo, many making their domestic Australian terrestrial premieres; many have been already available through streaming services or on pay-TV services like Foxtel.

Some of the shows aired on the channel include Million Dollar Listing New York, The Real Housewives of New Jersey, The Kelly Clarkson Show, The Tonight Show Starring Jimmy Fallon, Judge Jerry, Below Deck, and Botched. No library content from Seven or its sister services is currently a part of the network's schedule.

Programs making their free-to-air debut include Dinner Date, Top Chef and Killer Couples, with Saturday Night Live returning to free-to-air for the first time in many years after decades on Foxtel.

Current programming

 Million Dollar Listing New York
 The Real Housewives of New Jersey
 Judge Jerry
 The Kelly Clarkson Show
 The Tonight Show Starring Jimmy Fallon
 Hollywood Medium With Tyler Henry
 Songland Dinner Date Top Chef Below Deck 911 Crisis Centre Buried in the Backyard Exhumed Botched
 The Real Housewives of Dubai
 The Real Housewives Ultimate Girls Trip
 Killer Couples
 Below Deck Down Under
 The Real Housewives of Orange County
 Get a Room with Carson & Thom
 Relative Success with Tabatha
 Real Girlfriends in Paris
 Made in Chelsea
 Saturday Night Live
 The Real Housewives of New York City

Availability
7Bravo is available in high definition in metropolitan and regional areas through Seven Network owned-and-operated stations: ATN Sydney, HSV Melbourne, BTQ Brisbane, SAS Adelaide, TVW Perth, STQ Regional Queensland, AMV Victoria, NEN Northern NSW, CBN Southern NSW and PTV Mildura. SCA Seven and WIN Television stations as well as Seven-owned Seven Regional WA do not carry 7Bravo.

See also

 List of digital television channels in Australia

References

External links

Seven Network
NBCUniversal networks
Digital terrestrial television in Australia
English-language television stations in Australia
2023 establishments in Australia
Television channels and stations established in 2023